Brithney Gutiérrez (born 21 May 1999) is a Guatemalan footballer who plays as a defender for Unifut Rosal and the Guatemala women's national team.

References

1999 births
Living people
Women's association football defenders
Guatemalan women's footballers
Guatemala women's international footballers